The Roman Catholic Church in the Dominican Republic comprises two ecclesiastical provinces, each headed by an archbishop. Each province is subdivided into an archdiocese and dioceses (nine in total), each headed by a bishop or an archbishop.

Structured list of dioceses

Episcopal Conference of the Dominican Republic

Ecclesiastical province of Santo Domingo 
 Archdiocese of Santo Domingo
 Diocese of Baní
 Diocese of Barahona
 Diocese of Nuestra Señora de la Altagracia en Higüey
 Diocese of San Juan de la Maguana
 Diocese of San Pedro de Macorís

Ecclesiastical province of Santiago de los Caballeros 
 Archdiocese of Santiago de los Caballeros
 Diocese of La Vega
 Diocese of Mao-Monte Cristi
 Diocese of Puerto Plata
 Diocese of San Francisco de Macorís

Sui iuris jurisdictions 
 Military Bishopric of Dominican Republic

List of dioceses

References
Catholic-Hierarchy entry.
GCatholic.org.

Dominican Republic
Catholic dioceses